Drvaspa (druuāspā, drvāspā, drwāspā) is the Avestan language name of an "enigmatic" and "strangely discreet" Zoroastrian divinity, whose name literally means "with solid horses" and which she is then nominally the hypostasis of.

The word drvaspa is grammatically feminine. Proceeding from an observation in James Darmesteter's Avesta (1875), "it has been customary to compare her to the Celtic Epona."

In scripture
Despite the meaning of her name "with solid horses," Drvaspa does not appear in any context referring to horses, and is instead invoked in the company of Geush Tashan and Geush Urvan, respectively representing the body and soul of cattle. This association occurs in the Siroza, the 30 verses of the 30 days of the Zoroastrian calendar month: the 14th day of the month is dedicated to Geush Urvan ("soul of the kine"), but in the Siroza verse recited on that day, the three divinities are invoked together and they are together described as patrons of the animal world.

The 33 verses of Yasht 9, the hymn to Drvaspa, are—appropriately adjusted—copies of verses 27–52 of Yasht 17, which is dedicated to Ashi. This has in turn prompted a suggestion that Drvaspa was once an epithet of Ashi, and as is common in Indo-Iranian religious tradition, the epithet developed into a name of an independent divinity.

Because the hymn to Drvaspa is a copy of a section of the hymn to Ashi, and a part of this section also appears in the hymn to Aredvi Sura Anahita, these three divinities share several characteristics. For example, in Yasht 17.45-47, 9.25-27 and 5.106-108, Ashi, Drvaspa and Aredvi Sura are respectively invoked by Zoroaster for a boon so that the prophet might succeed in convincing the same figure to follow him. The wish is granted each time, and Zoroaster succeeds in his mission.

In tradition
Drvaspa only appears once in the medieval texts of Zoroastrian tradition. In this instance, in (Greater) Bundahishn XXVI.65, the steeds of Drvaspa are compared to those of Hvare-khshaeta.

The Middle Persian name given to the Avestan hymn to Drvaspa (Yasht 9, see above) was Gosh Yasht, that is, "hymn to the kine." This discrepancy has prompted a suggestion that Drvaspa was functionally a cattle guardian of horses.

In iconography
Drvaspa appears on Kushan coins as 'Drooaspo' (ΛΡΟΟΑΣΠΟ), which is however a masculine form of the name, and Drvaspa is depicted as a male figure. "This form is to be identified with the Middle Persian name Lwhl'sp/Lohrāsp of the father of Vištāspa, though the identification is somewhat problematic as, in the Avestan tradition, the latter is called Auruuataspa- 'of the rapid horses'."

References

Bibliography

 
 
 
 

Yazatas